Maurice Rozenthal (born 20 June 1975) is a French former professional ice hockey player.

Personal
Rozenthal is Jewish, and is the identical twin brother of François Rozenthal, who is also a French ice hockey player.

Ice hockey career
He has been affiliated with Gothiques d'Amiens, in Amiens, France, and  IF Björklöven, in Umeå, Sweden.

Rozenthal participated for France in ice hockey, playing on the France men's national ice hockey team, in both the 1998 Winter Olympics in Nagano, and the 2002 Winter Olympics in Salt Lake City.

Awards
1994–95:  French League Best Young Player "Jean-Pierre Graff Trophy"
1994–95, 1998–99, 1999–2000, 2000–01, 2005–06:  French League Best French Player "Albert Hassler Trophy"
2004–08:  French All-Star Team

Career statistics

Regular season and playoffs

FRA totals do not include stats from the 2000–01 season.

International

See also
List of select Jewish ice hockey players

References

External links
 
 

1975 births
Living people
IF Björklöven players
Corsaires de Dunkerque players
Dragons de Rouen players
French ice hockey centres
20th-century French Jews
Gothiques d'Amiens players
HC Morzine-Avoriaz players
Hockey Club de Reims players
Ice hockey players at the 1998 Winter Olympics
Ice hockey players at the 2002 Winter Olympics
Identical twins
Jewish ice hockey players
Leksands IF players
LHC Les Lions players
Olympic ice hockey players of France
Ours de Villard-de-Lans players
Scorpions de Mulhouse players
Sportspeople from Dunkirk
French twins
Twin sportspeople